Gulosibacter chungangensis is a Gram-positive, strictly aerobic and non-spore-forming bacterium from the genus Gulosibacter which has been isolated from marine sediments from the Yellow Sea in Korea.

References

Microbacteriaceae
Bacteria described in 2012